Lister Mills (otherwise known as Manningham Mills) was the largest silk factory in the world. It is located in the Manningham district of Bradford, West Yorkshire, England and was built by Samuel Cunliffe Lister to replace the original Manningham Mills which had been destroyed by fire in 1871.  The mill is a Grade II* listed building, built in the Italianate style of Victorian architecture.

History
On completion in 1873, Lister's was the largest textile mill in the north of England. Samuel Lister called it "Lister's Pride". Until the arrival of electric power in 1934, the mill was driven by huge steam engines. Every week the boilers consumed 1,000 tons of coal brought in on company rail wagons from the company collieries near Pontefract. Water was also vital in the process and the company had its own supply network including a large covered reservoir on-site (now in 2006 that area is a piazza and underground car park).

At its height, Lister's employed 11,000 men, women and children – manufacturing high-quality textiles such as velvet and silk. It supplied  of velvet for King George V's coronation and in 1976 new velvet curtains for the President Ford White House.

A strike in 1890–91 at the mill was important in the establishment of the Independent Labour Party which later helped found the modern-day Labour Party.

Decline 

The Listers' business decreased considerably during the 1980s.  Stiff foreign competition and changing textile trends such as increased use of artificial fibres were the reasons.  In 1999 the mills were closed.  Being a prominent structure the mills attracted a great deal of attention and several regeneration proposals came and went.  The sheer size of the buildings being a major difficulty.  However local residents, former workers and, notably, Reverend George Moffat never lost hope that the mills would rise again.  They campaigned hard to save the mills.

Rebirth 

In 2000 property developers Urban Splash bought the mills.  They planned to renovate the existing larger buildings and build new ones.  Apartments, workplaces, shops and public spaces were planned to be part of Listers.  A deal was finally struck whereby remedial work on the structures and removal of industrial waste would be part-funded by Yorkshire Forward, Bradford Council and English Heritage. In September 2004 Freda Watts, a former silk weaver at Listers, cut a ribbon across the entrance to the mills – construction work had started.

The next landmark for the £100 million project was the sales launch of the first phase.  In late 2004 over 2,000 people queued (some overnight) to buy one of the 131 apartments being created in the south mill, now renamed Silk Warehouse.  It was a sell out and a great boost for the project and the wider regeneration of Bradford 

New residents started moving in during 2006.  The next phase, regenerating the second large building is to be called Velvet Mill.  It is planned to replace the existing roof on this building with a glass and steel structure housing two storey apartments.  David Morley practice are the architects.  The new homes went on sale in early 2007.  The plan is to create a new piazza with the huge mill chimney at its centre.

See also
Grade II* listed buildings in Bradford
Listed buildings in Bradford (Toller Ward)
Bliss Tweed Mill
Salts Mill

References

External links 

 Manningham Regeneration website
 Bradford Centre Regeneration website

Textile mills in Bradford
Silk mills
Manningham, Bradford
Former textile mills in the United Kingdom
Grade II* listed buildings in West Yorkshire
Grade II* listed industrial buildings